Mang, or Mashan Miao also known as Mashan Hmong (麻山 máshān), is a Miao language of China, spoken primarily in Ziyun Miao and Buyei Autonomous County, southwestern Guizhou province, southwest China. The endonym is Mang, similar to other West Hmongic languages such as Mong.

Varieties
Mang was classified as a branch of Western Hmongic in Wang (1985), who listed four varieties. Matisoff (2001) gave these four varieties the status of separate languages, and, conservatively, did not retain them as a single group within West Hmongic. Li Yunbing (2000) added two minor varieties which had been left unclassified in Wang, Southeastern (Strecker's "Luodian Muyin") and Southwestern ("Wangmo").

Central Mang: 70,000 speakers
Northern Mang: 35,000
Western Mang: 14,000
Southern Mang: 10,000
Southeastern Mang: 4,000
Southwestern Mang: 4,000

Phonology and script
A pinyin alphabet had been created for Mang in 1985, but proved to have deficiencies. Wu and Yang (2010) report the creation of a new alphabet, albeit a tentative one, based on the Central Mang dialect of Ziyun County, Zōngdì 宗地 township, Dàdìbà 大地坝 village.

Consonants, in pinyin, are:
labial: b p nb np, m f v, by py nby my, bl pl nbl npl ml
lateral: l lj
dental or alveolar stops: d t dl dj nd nt n
dental affricates: z c s nz nc
retroflex: dr tr ndr nr sh r
alveolo-palatal: j q nj x y ny
velar or uvular: g k ngg ng, h w hw
(zero onset)
The Latin voiced/voiceless opposition has been coopted to indicate aspiration, as usual in pinyin alphabets.

Correspondences between Central Mang dialects include Dadiba retroflex dr, tr with dental z, c in another village of the same Zongdi township, Sanjiao (三脚 Sānjiǎo). The other five varieties of Mang have more palatalized initials than Central Mang, though these can be transcribed as medial -i-.

Vowels and finals, including those needed for Chinese loans, are:

a aa  ai ao ain ange ea ei en ein eu ew engi iou in ie iu iao ian iango ou ow ongu uw ua ui ue un uai uan uangyu''

Most Central Mang and Western Mang dialects have eleven to thirteen tones. Compared to the eight tone categories of other Western Hmongic languages, the odd-numbered tones are each split into two. The tones of at least three villages of Central Mang have been documented: Dadiba (Wu & Yang 2010), Jiaotuozhai (Wang & Mao 1995; Li 2000), and Jingshuiping (Xian 1990; Mortensen 2006, all in the Zongdi township of Ziyun County. They lie several kilometers apart and have minor differences.

Although some pairs of tones (such as tones 6 and 7b) have the same value when pronounced alone, they behave differently with regard to tone sandhi and should be treated as different phonologically. Tones also interact with phonation types and vowel quality. Jiaotuozhai tones 4 and 6 are breathy voiced and have higher vowels.

References

West Hmongic languages
Languages of China